Henrik Ingebrigtsen (born 24 February 1991) is a Norwegian middle-distance runner who competes mainly in the 1500 metres. He represented Norway at the 2012 and 2016 Summer Olympics. His younger brothers, Filip Ingebrigtsen and Jakob Ingebrigtsen, are also middle-distance runners, the latter of which won the 1500m gold at the 2020 games.

Athletic career
Ingebrigtsen first broke the 3:40 barrier in the 1500 meters at the age of 19.  He won the gold medal at the 2012 European Athletics Championships in Helsinki at the 1500 metres event. He followed it by finishing 5th at the Olympic Games in London with a new national record of 3:35.43. Ingebrigtsen further improved the national record to 3:33.95 at the Diamond League meet held in Zürich on August 29, 2013.

In May 2018, he won the men's 5000 metres at the Payton Jordan Invitational with a PB 13:16.97, winning by only 0.005 seconds. He had run the last 400 metres of the race in 56.27 seconds.

On June 13, 2019, he set a new Norwegian record for 3000 metres, running 7:36.85 at the Bislett Games in Oslo, Norway.

International competitions

References

External links
 
 

1991 births
Living people
People from Sandnes
Norwegian male middle-distance runners
Olympic athletes of Norway
Athletes (track and field) at the 2012 Summer Olympics
Athletes (track and field) at the 2016 Summer Olympics
World Athletics Championships athletes for Norway
European Athletics Championships medalists
Ingebrigtsen family
Norwegian Athletics Championships winners
Sportspeople from Rogaland